Talal Al Fadhel (born 11 August 1990) is a Kuwaiti footballer who plays for Kazma Sporting Club as a midfielder.

References 

1990 births
Living people
Association football defenders
Kuwaiti footballers
2015 AFC Asian Cup players
Sportspeople from Kuwait City
Kuwait international footballers
Saham SC players
Oman Professional League players
Kuwait SC players
Kuwait Premier League players
Kazma SC players
Kuwaiti expatriate sportspeople in Oman
Expatriate footballers in Oman
Kuwaiti expatriate footballers